Dasht Raz (also known as Dasht Zar) is a village in Jirandeh Rural District, Amarlu District, Rudbar County, Gilan Province, Iran. At the 2006 census, its population was 64, in 16 families.

References 

Populated places in Rudbar County